Barrow-in-Furness Borough Council in Cumbria, England is elected every 4 years. This was changed in 2011 from the previous situation where one third of the council was elected each year, followed by one year where there was an election to Cumbria County Council instead.

Since the last boundary changes in 2008, 36 councillors have been elected from 13 wards.

Political control
Since the first election to the council in 1973 political control of the council has been held by the following parties:

Leadership
The leaders of the council since 2008 have been:

Council elections
1973 Barrow-in-Furness Borough Council election
1976 Barrow-in-Furness Borough Council election
1979 Barrow-in-Furness Borough Council election (New ward boundaries)
1980 Barrow-in-Furness Borough Council election
1982 Barrow-in-Furness Borough Council election
1983 Barrow-in-Furness Borough Council election
1984 Barrow-in-Furness Borough Council election
1986 Barrow-in-Furness Borough Council election
1987 Barrow-in-Furness Borough Council election
1988 Barrow-in-Furness Borough Council election
1990 Barrow-in-Furness Borough Council election
1991 Barrow-in-Furness Borough Council election
1992 Barrow-in-Furness Borough Council election
1994 Barrow-in-Furness Borough Council election
1995 Barrow-in-Furness Borough Council election
1996 Barrow-in-Furness Borough Council election
1998 Barrow-in-Furness Borough Council election
1999 Barrow-in-Furness Borough Council election (New ward boundaries)
2000 Barrow-in-Furness Borough Council election
2002 Barrow-in-Furness Borough Council election
2003 Barrow-in-Furness Borough Council election
2004 Barrow-in-Furness Borough Council election
2006 Barrow-in-Furness Borough Council election
2007 Barrow-in-Furness Borough Council election
2008 Barrow-in-Furness Borough Council election (New ward boundaries reduced the number of seats by 2)
2010 Barrow-in-Furness Borough Council election
2011 Barrow-in-Furness Borough Council election
2015 Barrow-in-Furness Borough Council election
2019 Barrow-in-Furness Borough Council election

Borough result maps

By-election results

1994-1998

1998-2002

2006-2011

2015-2019

The by-election was triggered by the death of Councillor Bill Bleasdale of the Conservative Party.

2019-2023

References

By-election results

External links
Barrow-in-Furness Council

 
Politics of Barrow-in-Furness
Council elections in Cumbria
District council elections in England